The Northrop Grumman Guardian is a passive anti-missile countermeasure system designed specifically to protect commercial airliners from shoulder-launched missiles (commonly known as MANPADS), using directed infrared countermeasures (DIRCM) technology.

According to The Wall Street Journal, the program is now the subject of a lawsuit alleging that "in 2007 and 2008 the company intentionally inflated costs, presented false bills, lied about progress and withheld test data from the Department of Homeland Security."

Background
The extensive proliferation of MANPADS has resulted in many being available to non-state groups on the international arms black market, sometimes for as little as US$5,000 each. This has resulted in a marked increase of MANPADS attacks on commercial airliners, including the failed 2002 Mombasa airliner attack, the 2003 Baghdad DHL attempted shootdown incident and the 2007 Mogadishu TransAVIAexport Airlines Il-76 crash. According to the U.S. State Department, over 40 civilian aircraft have been hit with MANPADS since 1970, with about 400 passengers and crewmembers killed. Of these, six were airliners.

In 2003, Senator Barbara Boxer (D-CA) and Congressman Steve Israel (D-NY) introduced legislation in both the House and Senate (H.R. 580/S. 311 The Commercial Airline Missile Defense Act) that directed the Department of Homeland Security (DHS) to sponsor a research and development program that would result in a missile defense system that could be installed on commercial airliners; the bill also authorized funding for the program.

As a result, the DHS initiated the "counter-MANDPADS" or "C-MANPADS" program in January, 2004, which tasked several defense contractors to adapt existing military countermeasures systems to commercial usage.

Description 
The Guardian incorporates existing infrared countermeasures military technology, adapted from the AAQ-24 Nemesis system, in a commercial package that has been tested and certified by the FAA under a Supplemental Type Certificate for the Boeing 747, McDonnell Douglas DC-10/MD-10 and McDonnell Douglas MD-11.

Guardian is designed to operate autonomously, without input from the flight crew. An array of sensors detects a missile approaching the aircraft and passes this information to an infrared tracking camera. The system's computer analyses the input signals, to confirm that the threat is real, and then directs a beam of an eye-safe infrared laser at the incoming object. The laser is intended to introduce a false target into the missile's guidance system, causing it to turn away from the aircraft. The detect-track-jam process lasts for two to three seconds. The system then automatically notifies the pilot and air traffic control that a threat has been jammed.

The system is wholly contained in an external, 460 mm (18 inch) high pod that weighs 250 kg (550 lb) and is mounted to the underside of the fuselage. The pod is removable, and can be transferred to another aircraft within an hour. The system costs US$1 million per aircraft, and, when ongoing maintenance costs are also considered, Northrop Grumman estimates that the system will cost each passenger an additional dollar in ticket price.

Development
The Guardian was developed under a DHS program. In August, 2005, Northrop Grumman received DHS phase II design approval of the system after it met three main design review criteria.

Also, as a part of Phase II of the DHS program, flight testing began in August, 2005 on a FedEx Express McDonnell Douglas MD-11. Flight tests were then conducted on a Boeing 747 which FedEx leased from Air Atlanta Icelandic. The flight tests were conducted at the Mojave Civilian Aerospace Test Center with the aircraft flying simulated takeoff and landing profiles while being engaged by an electronic system that simulates missile tracking and launch events. The simulator reported tests to be 100% successful.

A civilian version of the system is being developed under the U.S. Department of Homeland Security's Project CHLOE.

The Air National Guard has tested the system on the Boeing KC-135 Stratotanker aircraft.

Deployment

The third phase of the program, costing US$109 million is the deployment of the system on commercial flights. FedEx Express became the first air carrier to deploy the Guardian on a commercial flight in September 2006, when it equipped one of its MD-11 freighters with the pod, and subsequently equipped eight more aircraft for evaluation purposes.

In view of the initially successful results, Congress directed DHS in October, 2006 to expand the program to include "a service evaluation in the passenger-carrying environment." This will result in 12 commercial airliners to be equipped with the system to gather data on the system's operational impact in regular service.

See also
 2002 Mombasa attacks – attack was co-ordinated with the shootdown attempt.
 AN/ALQ-144 – Infrared guided missile countermeasure system
 Civil Aircraft Missile Protection System
 Common Infrared Countermeasures program
 Directional Infrared Counter Measures
 Flight Guard
 List of airliner shootdown incidents

References

External links

Northrop Grumman Guardian

Missile countermeasures
Northrop Grumman
FedEx